The following radio stations broadcast on FM frequency 107.7 MHz:

Argentina
 Azul in Río Primero, Córdoba
 Cadena Energy in Alta Italia, La Pampa
 Chajarí al Día in Chajarí, Entre Ríos
 del Parque in Casbas, Buenos Aires
 Digital in Villa Ocampo, Santa Fe
 Flash in Santa Rosa de Calamuchita, Córdoba
 Futura in Diamante, Entre Ríos
 LRR 717 San Roque in San Roque, Corrientes
 Mitre Mar del Plata in Mar del Plata, Buenos Aires
 Nación in Posadas, Misiones
 Pop Life in San Juan
 Q in Formosa
 Quilpo in San Marcos Sierras, Córdoba
 Escucha in Tortuguitas, Buenos Aires 
 Golden in Rio Cuarto, Córdoba
 Espíritu Santo in Córdoba
 Estudio in Campana, Buenos Aires
 Estudio in Mendoza
 Paraíso in Punta Alta, Buenos Aires
 Radio María in General Roca, Río Negro
 Radio María in Rafaela, Santa Fe
 Rhema in Allen, Río Negro
 San Carlos in San Carlos Centro, Santa Fe
 Urbana in San Luis
 Voces in Lomas de Zamora, Buenos Aires

Armenia
Public Radio of Armenia at Yerevan

Australia
 2DRY FM in Broken Hill, New South Wales
 2GGO in Gosford, New South Wales
 Ace Radio in Swan Hill, Victoria
 Radio National in Coober Pedy, South Australia
 Sea FM (Australian radio network) in Devonport, Tasmania
 Triple J in Brisbane, Queensland

Canada (Channel 299)
 CBEZ-FM in Britt, Ontario
 CFRV-FM in Lethbridge, Alberta
 CFSM-FM-3 in Invermere, British Columbia
 CHGK-FM in Stratford, Ontario
 CHMY-FM-1 in Arnprior, Ontario
 CIRG-FM in Cornwall, Ontario
 CIRH-FM in Halifax, Nova Scotia
 CISF-FM in Surrey, British Columbia
 CITA-FM-4 in Bouctouche, New Brunswick
 CJFY-FM in Blackville, New Brunswick
 CJRO-FM in Carlsbad Springs, Ontario
 CJXR-FM in Steinbach, Manitoba
 CKDO-FM-1 in Oshawa, Ontario
 CKHK-FM in Hawksbury, Ontario
 CKOY-FM in Sherbrooke, Quebec
 CKTI-FM in Kettle Point, Ontario
 CKUA-FM-6 in Red Deer, Alberta
 VF2485 in Black Brook, New Brunswick
 VF2486 in Deersdale, New Brunswick
 VF2487 in Kedgwick, New Brunswick
 VF2560 in Pemberton, Ontario

China 

 CNR Music Radio in Changsha, Kunshan, Miluo, Shanghai, Suzhou and Yueyang

France
 In France this frequency is used by low power transmitters along the motorways/highways to provide traffic information services to drivers. Several networks (e.g. Radio Vinci Autoroutes, Autoroute Info, Sanef 107,7) air their programme on FM 107.7 by low power transmitters, which can only be received on the highways and in a short distance away from the highway. These three stations are all well-known for their frequent traffic reports (every 15 minutes), although the music accounts for 90% of their daily programming, with ten songs per hour.

Indonesia
 Radio Alfa Omega in Batam and Singapore
 Radio JJM in Jakarta, Indonesia
 UMN Radio in Tangerang, Indonesia

Malaysia
Buletin FM in Malacca and Northern Johor

Mexico
 XHASM-FM in Ahuatepec, Morelos
 XHIXMI-FM in Ixmiquilpan, Hidalgo
 XHMN-FM in Monterrey, Nuevo León
 XHRST-FM in Tijuana, Baja California
 XHSCAP-FM in Miahuatlán de Porfirio Díaz, Oaxaca
 XHSCHE-FM in Santa María Del Oro, Durango
 XHSCIO-FM in Ahuatitla, San Felipe Orizatlán municipality, Hidalgo
 XHUARO-FM in Pátzcuaro, Michoacán
 XHXAL-FM in Xalapa, Veracruz
 XHYZ-FM in Aguascalientes, Aguascalientes
 XHZCM-FM in Cozumel, Quintana Roo

New Zealand
Various low-power stations up to 1 watt

South Korea
 SBS PowerFM

Taiwan
 Hit Fm Taiwan in Taipei, Hualien
 National Education Radio in Chiayi, Tainan

United Kingdom
 Greatest Hits Radio South West in Swindon (Wiltshire) and North Somerset
 More Radio Worthing in Worthing, West Sussex, formerly 107.7 Splash FM
 Smooth North East in Teesside
 Greatest Hits Radio Midlands in Wolverhampton (Black Country) and Shropshire
 Radio Essex in Chelmsford
 Heart Wales in Aberystwyth and Ceredigion

United States (Channel 299)
 KABD in Ipswich, South Dakota
 KBMX in Proctor, Minnesota
 KBPY in Hay Springs, Nebraska
 KCBN in Hamilton, Texas
 KCDZ in Twentynine Palms, California
 KCVK in Otterville, Missouri
 KDCZ in Saint Charles, Minnesota
 KFFW-LP in Atwater, California
 KGCR in Goodland, Kansas
 KHSQ in Trinidad, California
 KICD-FM in Spencer, Iowa
 KIRS in Stockton, Missouri
 KIST-FM in Carpinteria, California
 KJAG in Guthrie, Texas
 KJLL-LP in Hobbs, New Mexico
 KKOA in Volcano, Hawaii
 KLAL in Wrightsville, Arkansas
 KLJA in Georgetown, Texas
 KLZK-FM in Idalou, Texas
 KLOT-LP in Cat Spring, Texas
 KMAJ-FM in Carbondale, Kansas
 KMTZ in Walkerville, Montana
 KNDD in Seattle, Washington
 KNYO-LP in Fort Bragg, California
 KOTU-LP in Riddle, Oregon
 KOUL in Agua Dulce, Texas
 KPLT-FM in Paris, Texas
 KPWJ in Kurten, Texas
 KRXO-FM in Oklahoma City, Oklahoma
 KSAN (FM) in San Mateo, California
 KSLZ in Saint Louis, Missouri
 KSRN in Kings Beach, California
 KSYZ-FM in Grand Island, Nebraska
 KTBQ in Nacogdoches, Texas
 KWVN-FM in Pendleton, Oregon
 KWXS in Prineville, Oregon
 WACC-LP in Enfield, Connecticut
 WAIY-LP in Belchertown, Massachusetts
 WAJP in Perry, Florida
 WAZA (FM) in Liberty, Mississippi
 WBKA in Bar Harbor, Maine
 WCIW-LP in Immokalee, Florida
 WECW in Elmira, New York
 WEGC in Sasser, Georgia
 WFCS in New Britain, Connecticut
 WFSP-FM in Kingwood, West Virginia
 WFUG-LP in Lehigh Acres, Florida
 WFXX in Georgiana, Alabama
 WGBG-FM in Fruitland, Maryland
 WGNA-FM in Albany, New York
 WGTY in Gettysburg, Pennsylvania
 WGWY-LP in Greenville, South Carolina
 WHFX in Darien, Georgia
 WHHM-FM in Henderson, Tennessee
 WHQX in Gary, West Virginia
 WHSB in Alpena, Michigan
 WHSL in Lisman, Alabama
 WIBL in Fairbury, Illinois
 WIVK-FM in Knoxville, Tennessee
 WJRP-LP in Calhoun, Georgia
 WKYN in Mount Sterling, Kentucky
 WLBX-LP in Decherd, Tennessee
 WLGD in Dallas, Pennsylvania
 WLKK in Wethersfield, New York
 WLLJ-LP in Cape Coral, Florida
 WLWR-LP in Marinette, Wisconsin
 WMES-LP in Altoona, Pennsylvania
 WMGF in Mount Dora, Florida
 WMMX in Dayton, Ohio
 WMOV-FM in Norfolk, Virginia
 WMQT in Ishpeming, Michigan
 WMRS in Monticello, Indiana
 WPFX-FM in Luckey, Ohio
 WPOV-LP in Vineland, New Jersey
 WPRW-FM in Martinez, Georgia
 WQBS-FM in Carolina, Puerto Rico
 WQUD in Erie, Illinois
 WRKR in Portage, Michigan
 WRQW in Cooperstown, Pennsylvania
 WRRC in Lawrenceville, New Jersey
 WRWL-LP in Galloway, New Jersey
 WSEO in Nelsonville, Ohio
 WSFR in Corydon, Indiana
 WTPL in Hillsboro, New Hampshire
 WUHT in Birmingham, Alabama
 WUKS in Saint Pauls, North Carolina
 WVCY-FM in Milwaukee, Wisconsin
 WVEW-LP in Brattleboro, Vermont
 WVPK-LP in Paducah, Kentucky
 WVRW in Glenville, West Virginia
 WWDW in Alberta, Virginia
 WWRX (FM) in Bradford, Rhode Island
 WWWT-FM in Manassas, Virginia
 WXXF in Loudonville, Ohio

References

Lists of radio stations by frequency